The following is a comprehensive list of American pop-rock artist, Kelly Clarkson's promotional tours. The singer has also been on numerous headlining and co-headlining concert tours.

2003: Kelly Clarkson in Concert

Kelly Clarkson in Concert is a promotional tour by American pop rock artist, Kelly Clarkson. The tour supported her debut album, Thankful. Primarily visiting the United States, the singer played state and county fairs, along with theatres. Stops in California were cancelled due to illness and were unable to be rescheduled. Clarkson's setlist composed of songs from her album and covers from Aretha Franklin, Garth Brooks, Reba McEntire, Bonnie Raitt, Aerosmith and No Doubt. The tour was proposed to include Japan and the United Kingdom, however, it did not come to fruition.

Setlist
"Low"
"What's Up Lonely"
"Some Kind of Miracle"
"You Thought Wrong" 
"Just Missed the Train"
"How Will I Know" – (Whitney Houston cover)
"Love Takes Time" –  (Mariah Carey cover)
"Why Haven't I Heard from You" – (Reba cover)
"Somewhere Other Than the Night" – (Garth Brooks cover)
"(You Make Me Feel Like) A Natural Woman" – (Aretha Franklin cover)
"Spiderwebs" – (No Doubt cover)
"Eat the Rich" – (Aerosmith cover)
"Something to Talk About" – (Bonnie Raitt cover)
"Thankful"
Encore	
"Miss Independent"
"A Moment Like This"
Source:

Tour dates

Festivals and other miscellaneous performances
This concert was a part of the "Indiana State Fair"
This concert was a part of the "Wisconsin State Fair"
This concert was a part of the "Midland County Fair"
This concert was a part of the "Erie County Fair"
This concert was a part of the "Upper Peninsula State Fair"

Cancellations and rescheduled shows

2009: Kelly Clarkson: Live in Concert

Kelly Clarkson: Live in Concert also known as the All I Ever Wanted Summer Fair Tour, is a promotional tour by American pop artist, Kelly Clarkson. The tour promoted her fourth studio album, All I Ever Wanted. For the tour, Clarkson played at state and county fairs, along with, radio and college festivals in the United States, Canada, and England.

Opening acts
Gavin DeGraw (select dates)
Eric Hutchinson (select dates)
Krista (select dates)
The Lost Boys (Kelseyville)

Setlist
"All I Ever Wanted"
"Miss Independent"
"I Do Not Hook Up"
"Some Guys Have All The Luck" – (Rod Stewart cover) *Changed to "Some Girls Have All The Luck"
"Don't Let Me Stop You"
"Breakaway"
"If I Can't Have You"
"Never Again"
"Behind These Hazel Eyes"
"Walkin' After Midnight" – (Patsy Cline cover)
"Cry"
"I Want You"
"Whyyawannabringmedown"
"Because of You"
"Walk Away"
"Since U Been Gone"
Encore
"Already Gone"
"If"  – (Janet Jackson cover)
"My Life Would Suck Without You"

Notes
During the concert in Thackerville, Clarkson performed "The Greatest Man I Never Knew"
"Whyyawannabringmedown" and "If" were not performed in York and Allegan.

Source:

Tour dates

Festivals and other miscellaneous performances

This concert was a part of "Universal Orlando's Mardi Gras"
This concert was a part of "Last Smash Platinum Bash"
This concert was a part of the "Grammy Celebration Concert Tour"
This concert was a part of "Wango Tango"
This concert was a part of "KDWB's Star Party"
This concert was a part of "Zootopia"
This concert was a part of the "Summertime Ball"
This concert was a part of "UVUphoria"
This concert was a part of the "B96 Pepsi SummerBash"
This concert was a part of the "San Diego County Fair"
This concert was a part of the "Calgary Stampede"
This concert was a part of the "Orange County Fair"
This concert was a part of the "California Mid-State Fair"

This concert was a part of the "Ohio State Fair"
This concert was a part of the "Delaware State Fair"
This concert was a part of the "Clearfield County Fair"
This concert was a part of the "Indiana State Fair"
This concert was a part of the "Illinois State Fair"
This concert was a part of the "Kentucky State Fair"
This concert was a part of the "Iowa State Fair"
This concert was a part of the "Great New York State Fair"
This concert was a part of the "Great Allentown Fair"
This concert was a part of the "Champlain Valley Exposition"
This concert was a part of the "York Fair"
This concert was a part of the "Allegan County Fair"

Cancellations and rescheduled shows

Box office score data

See also
List of Kelly Clarkson concert tours

References

Promotional tours
Clarkson, Kelly